What Truth Sounds Like: Robert F. Kennedy, James Baldwin, and Our Unfinished Conversation About Race in America is a 2018 non-fiction book by Michael Eric Dyson.

Overview
The book is an analysis of American race relations with the focal point a 1963 meeting between Senator Robert F. Kennedy and a group of notable African-Americans including James Baldwin, Harry Belafonte, Lena Horne and Lorraine Hansberry and Freedom Rider Jerome Smith.

References

External links
What Truth Sounds Like, Macmillan Publishers

2018 non-fiction books
English-language books
Books about race and ethnicity
Race in the United States
African-American literature
St. Martin's Press books